Hong Seong-Yo (born May 26, 1979) is a South Korean football player. He played for Chunnam Dragons, Gwangju Sangmu and Busan I'Park formerly.

External links
 

South Korean footballers
Konkuk University alumni
1979 births
Living people
Association football defenders
Jeonnam Dragons players
Busan IPark players